Edwin Alfred "Eddie" Caswell ( – 22 May 1949) was a Welsh professional rugby league footballer who played in the 1920s, and coached in the 1930s and 1940s.

Playing career

Rugby union
Born in Cefn Cribwr, Caswell began playing rugby union for Bridgend and Cardiff. In October 1919, he switched to rugby league, joining Hull.

Rugby league
Caswell played  in Hull's 9-10 defeat by Rochdale Hornets in the 1922 Challenge Cup Final during the 1921–22 season at Headingley Rugby Stadium, Leeds, in front of a crowd of 34,827.

Caswell won caps for Wales while at Hull 1922…1927 3-caps.

Coaching career
After retiring as a player, Caswell remained at Hull as a trainer. On 22 May 1949, he died after collapsing in an office at Hull's ground, The Boulevard.

References

1890s births
1949 deaths
Hull F.C. captains
Hull F.C. coaches
Hull F.C. players
Rugby league five-eighths
Rugby league players from Bridgend County Borough
Rugby union players from Bridgend County Borough
Wales national rugby league team players
Welsh rugby league players
Welsh rugby union players